Lobov is a Russian masculine surname, its feminine counterpart is Lobova. The surname is derived from the word лоб (lob, meaning "forehead") and may refer to:

 Artem Lobov (born 1986), Russian mixed martial artist
 Konstantin Lobov (born 1981), Russian football player
 Natalia Lobova (born 1986), Russian sprint canoer 
 Nina Lobova (born 1957), Ukrainian handball player
 Oleg Lobov (1937–2018), Russian politician 
 Semyon Lobov (1913–1977), Soviet Navy Admiral 

Russian-language surnames